Evgeny Sergeyevich Saleev (born 19 January 1989, in Mordovia) is a Russian Greco-Roman wrestler. He was the bronze medalist Golden Grand Prix Ivan Poddubny in the Greco-Roman men's 74 kg event. He competed at the World Wrestling Championships 2014 where he was a silver medalist. In the European Games 2015 in the final match he defeated Rafig Huseynov of Azerbaijan.

References

1989 births
Living people
European Games gold medalists for Russia
European Games medalists in wrestling
Wrestlers at the 2015 European Games
World Wrestling Championships medalists
Russian male sport wrestlers
Doping cases in wrestling
Russian sportspeople in doping cases
People from Saransk
Sportspeople from Mordovia